Olivia Louvel is a French-born British sound artist whose work draws on voice, computer music and digital narrative. The Sculptor Speaks, a resounding of a 1961 tape of Barbara Hepworth's voice, was nominated for an Ivor Novello Award in the Sound Art category at the Ivors Composer Awards 2020.
She was interviewed by Stuart Maconie on his BBC Radio 6 programme Freak Zone about her "compelling sculpture-inspired work" on Barbara Hepworth.
The "composer, researcher, and sound artist"   often operates at the intersection of creation and documentation.

Education
Louvel studied at the National Superior Conservatory of Dramatic Arts of Paris and had the opportunity to work with Klaus Michael Grüber and Michel Piccoli in a reworking of a Luigi Pirandello play. She holds a master's degree in Digital Music and Sound Art from DMSA, University of Brighton.

Career 
Initially trained in classical singing, she began to work as a singer for the flying trapeze circus Les Arts Sauts, performing at 12 metres in the air a Meredith Monk composition. She toured with them for three years, with notable performances at Festival de la Batie in Geneva, and Festival of Perth in 1995. 

December 2014, she produced an exclusive mix for Electronic Beats, which features her remix of Antye Greie's Poemproducer.

For Data Regina (2017), Olivia Louvel "packaged experimental electronic music, new media art, and 16th century conflict into multimedia art", exploring the reign of Mary Queen of Scots, through an interactive digital platform and an album release. 

In November 2018, she toured throughout the UK presenting a headline audio-visual set of Data Regina for Synth Remix, an event curated by Benjamin Tassie under Sound and Music's Composer-Curator scheme, also featuring Jo Thomas. 

With her generative sound mural The Whole Inside (2019), Louvel explored an explicit sociopolitical agenda: the violent misogyny of incel communities. The Whole Inside was selected for the Longlist at the Aesthetica Art Prize 2021, and is featured in the Aesthetica Art Prize Anthology: Future Now.  

Commissioned by avant-garde ensemble Juice Vocal, she composed ‘Not A Creature Of Paper’ (2019) a Louise Labé inspired composition, premiered at Kings Place, London.  

[Hepworth Resounds] (2020) is a multipartite sound art project based on British sculptor Barbara Hepworth. ‘The Sculptor Speaks’ is a resounding of a 1961 tape by Barbara Hepworth, premiered on Resonance Extra Resonance FM,  and followed by an audio-visual iteration. "The sculptor's cut-glass Received Pronunciation might be off-putting for the modern ear, but waves of technological manipulation have eroded its edges, turning it into a dreamy meditation on the nature of creativity."Deborah Nash, The Wire, [print], October 2020, issue 440.

The critically acclaimed album ‘SculptOr’ (2020) is a suite of nine pieces based on Hepworth's extensive writings. “Armed with an algorithmic chisel and mallet, Louvel repurposes writings by the late English sculptor Barbara Hepworth (...) SculptOr is a highly conceptual and meta-referential piece, a sort of meditation on artistic practices." 

Louvel has opened for artists such as Eartheater at De La Warr Pavilion, Japanese avant-garde artist Phew, Planningtorock at the Earsthetic Festival Brighton Dome, and Recoil for various concerts on the European Selected tour (2010). 

Her work has been featured in The Wire, The Quietus, Electronic Beats, Fact Mag, and Electronic Sound among others.

Louvel has been an active member of female:pressure, the international network of female, transgender and non-binary artists in the fields of electronic music and digital arts. In 2016, she contributed a "compelling audio-visual" Afraid Of Women to the female:pressure campaign—curated by Antye Greie-Ripatti—to raise awareness for the special de facto autonomous zone in northern Syria, Rojava.

Solo works

Collaborative practice

Under the moniker of The Digital Intervention, she worked with Paul Kendall (long term Mute Records collaborator) on the album Capture, which was released in 2003.

With Paul Kendall as The Digital Intervention, they produced the piece "When the sea will rise II'" or Acoustic Cameras, a project which invites sound artists to annex the real-time flow of webcams located in various places around the world.

Along with Daria Baiocchi, Fiona Hallinan, La Cosa Preziosa, Vicky Langan, Úna Lee, Jenn Kirby, Claudia Molitor, Gráinne Mulvey and Rachel Ní Chuinn, Louvel contributed to the collaborative art project "Mean Time" with her composition "25 minutes and 21 seconds". The event was broadcast live on Nova, RTÉ Lyric FM from Richmond Barracks, Dublin.

Along with Duncan Cabral, Jaimie Moore, Dominic Rae, Louvel performed with the Mi.Mu gloves '54 bones', a gesturally based performance art for an audience of one at Onca Gallery for Brighton Digital Festival 2018.

Discography

LPs
 Luna Parc Hotel. 03.2006, digipak CD with booklet. Angelika Koehlermann.
 Lulu in Suspension. 01.2008, deluxe digipak CD & digital. Optical Sound.
 Doll Divider. 02.2010, digital. Ototoi + Optical Sound.
 Doll Divider. 06.2011, 12" vinyl & digital (enhanced & remastered version). Cat Werk Imprint.
 ō , music for haiku. 12.2012, CD with hand drawn artwork & digital. Cat Werk Imprint.
 Beauty Sleep. 09.2014, digipak CD (DVD size). Cat Werk Imprint.
 Data Regina. 02.2017, digipak CD (DVD size). Cat Werk Imprint.
 SculptOr. 02.2020, digipak CD (DVD size). Cat Werk Imprint.

EPs
 Bats by Night, 02.2015, digital. Cat Werk Imprint.

Collaborations
Capture as The Digital Intervention (with Paul Kendall), 2003, CD. The Parallel Series + 0101 + Ici D'Ailleurs.

Compilations
 2013. Pussy Riot Freedom. female:pressure.Track featured ' Doll Divider'.
 2016. Music, Awareness & Solidarity w/ Rojava Revolution. female:pressure. Track featured 'Afraid of Women'.
 2017. Mind The Gap. Gonzo Circus. Track featured 'Good Queen Bess'.

Remix
 2016. Paris Multiplié  for Fiona Brice 'Postcards Reframed'. Bella Union.
 2021. Pathetique N.8 for CHAINES 'Beethoven Simulator'. Classical Remix.

Awards. Grants
2011. Qwartz Electronic Music Awards/ Prix Internationaux des Musiques Nouvelles.  Qwartz Album Award for 'Doll Divider'. 
2011. SACD Laureate / Prix de la SACD. Société des Auteurs et Compositeurs Dramatiques. 
2013. Prix Ars Electronica Digital music & Sound Art, nominated for 'ō, music for haiku'. 
2014. Arts Council of England. Grant for the Arts for 'Beauty Sleep'. 
2016. Arts Council of England. Grant for the Arts for 'Data Regina'. 
2020. Ivor Novello Award, Ivors Composer Awards, nominated in Sound Art for 'The Sculptor Speaks'.
2021. Aesthetica Art Prize. Longlisted for 'The Whole Inside'. 
2021. Arts Council of England. Developing Your Creative Practice (DYCP), a 3-month research grant.  
2022. Henry Moore Foundation, travel and research grant.

References

External links
 Olivia Louvel's website
 Olivia Louvel artist profile on iTunes

British electronic musicians
British women in electronic music
French electronic musicians
French emigrants to the United Kingdom
Living people
Year of birth missing (living people)